Mason Durie may refer to:
Mason Durie (community leader) (1889–1971), tribal leader from New Zealand
Mason Durie (psychiatrist) (born 1938), psychiatry professor from New Zealand